Najwa Allen (born 25 June 1994) is an Australian rules footballer who plays for Adelaide in the AFL Women's (AFLW).

Career
Hailing from Canberra, Allen represented Eastlake Demons in the NEAFL before making the move to South Australia to play in the highly regarded SANFL Women's league.

After a stand out 2019 season playing for Norwood in the SANFLW competition, Allen was awarded the leagues Best and Fairest. From there, she was on the radar of many AFLW clubs, eventually being taken by the Adelaide Crows with Pick 37 in the 2019 National Draft.

Debuting in Round 1, 2020, Allen has become a reliable defender for the Crows, running off half back. One of her strengths is the ability to kick with both feet and change the angles to create space for her side.

Playing every game in 2021, Allen was part of the Crows side which made the 2021 AFLW Grand Final.

References

External links
 
 

Living people
1994 births
Adelaide Football Club (AFLW) players
Australian rules footballers from the Australian Capital Territory
Sportswomen from the Australian Capital Territory